King's Highway 2A, commonly referred to as Highway 2A, was the designation of five separate provincially maintained highways in the Canadian province of Ontario. Highway 2A was an alternate route to Highway 2 in Chatham, London and Cornwall; these routes were all eventually redesignated. Highway 2A was also a highway that extended from Windsor to Tilbury, which was redesignated as Highway 98 in 1938.

The final and most familiar section of highway to be designated Highway 2A was the bypass of Highway 2 between Toronto and Newcastle, most of which became part of Highway 401 in July 1952. The short stub of dual carriageway feeding into a new alignment of Kingston Road with Highway 401 was renumbered 2A in 1956 with the completion of the Toronto Bypass. Despite losing its provincial highway status in 1998, Highway 2A was never renamed and is now part of Toronto's municipal expressway system.

Windsor–Tilbury 

The Windsor to Tilbury section of Highway 2A originally was designated in 1929 along the route of what would become Highway 114, near Maidstone. When Highway 18 was redesignated between Windsor and Leamington in 1931, Highway 2 was rerouted onto its former routing. The old routing of Highway 2 prior to that became Highway 2A, and the existing Highway 2A was renumbered as Highway 3B.

Between 1931 and 1938, the route followed the Provincial Highway between Tecumseh Road in downtown Windsor, and Mill Street in Tilbury, both at junctions with Highway 2. In 1938, the entire route was renumbered as Highway 98

Chatham 

Highway 2A in Chatham was established in 1957 along the original route of Highway 2 when it was rerouted along the West Chatham Bypass (Keil Street) and Grand Avenue. The route began at Highway 2 at the intersection of Richmond Street and Keil Street, following the former into downtown Chatham, where it turned north onto Queen Street then east onto School Street. From there, the route turned north onto Centre Street, which becomes 5th Street shortly thereafter. The route crossed the Thames River, north of which it became Thames Street and continued to Highway 2 (Grand Avenue East). The route was renumbered as Highway 2B in 1961 and decommissioned by 1970.

Cornwall 

Highway 2A (Alt.) in Cornwall was a short-lived designation applied along Nine Mile Road (now Power Dam Drive) and Second Street on the west side of the city. It provided an alternate bypass to the Seaway International Bridge. The route was established in 1965 and remained in place for only two years before being decommissioned in 1967.

London 

Highway 2A in London provided an alternative parallel route to Highway 2 through the downtown core, travelling from a concurrent Highway 2 and Highway 4 eastward along Stanley Street, York Street, Florence Street and finally Highbury Avenue. At its eastern end, it met Highway 2 (Dundas Street). The route was established in 1956 and decommissioned in 1968.

Toronto–Newcastle 
The Toronto section of Highway 2A is the only one of the five iterations that is still evident and in use today. Although it is no longer provincially maintained, it is still referenced by its highway designation on signage.

As automobile use in southern Ontario grew in the early twentieth century, road design and construction advanced significantly. Following frequent erosion of the former macadamized Lake Shore Road, a cement road known as the Toronto–Hamilton Highway was proposed in January 1914. By November 1914, the proposal was approved, and work began quickly to construct the road from Toronto to Hamilton known today as Lake Shore Boulevard and Lakeshore Road. It was the first concrete road in Ontario, as well as one of the longest stretches of concrete road between two cities in the world.

Over the next decade, vehicle usage increased substantially, and by 1920 Lakeshore Road was again highly congested on weekends. In response, the Department of Highways examined improving another road between Toronto and Hamilton. Middle Road, a continuation of Queen Street west of the Humber River, was chosen to avoid delays on Dundas or Lakeshore. Construction on what was then known as the Queen Street Extension (not to be confused with The Queensway) between Highway 10 and Highway 27 began in early 1931, and between Highway 27 and the Humber River on November 1, 1931.

Before the highway could be completed, Thomas McQuesten was appointed the new minister of the Department of Highways, with Robert Melville Smith as deputy minister, following the 1934 provincial elections. Smith, inspired by the German Autobahn's—new "dual-lane divided highways"—modified the design for Ontario roads, and McQuesten ordered that the Middle Road be converted into this new form of highway. A  right-of-way was purchased along the Middle Road and construction began to convert the existing sections to a divided highway, as well as on Canada's first interchange at Highway 10.

Beginning in 1935, McQuesten applied the concept of a dual-highway to several projects along Highway 2, including a section between Birchmount Road (then the eastern limit of urban development along Kingston Road) and east of Morningside Avenue in what was then known as Scarborough Township. When widening in Scarborough reached the Highland Creek ravine in 1936, east of Morningside, the Department of Highways began construction on a new bridge over the large valley, bypassing the former alignment around the village of West Hill. From there to Oshawa, the highway was constructed along a new alignment, avoiding construction on the congested Highway 2. As grading and bridge construction neared completion between Highland Creek and Ritson Road in September 1939, World War II broke out and gradually money was siphoned from highway construction to the war effort.

Following the war, construction resumed on roadways throughout Ontario. The expressway between Highland Creek and Oshawa was completed in December 1947. The Toronto–Barrie Highway was the primary focus of the Department of Highways at the time, and the onset of the Korean War in 1949 continued to stall construction. Despite the delays, highway minister George Doucette officially announced the plans for construction of the new trans-provincial expressway in 1950, with the Toronto to Oshawa expressway serving as a model for the design.

Along with an extension of the Highway between Oshawa and Highway 35 and Highway 115, most of Highway 2A was redesignated Highway 401 in July 1952. A short stub between West Hill and the planned Toronto Bypass retained the Highway 2A designation until April 1, 1997, when it was transferred to the City of Toronto as part of a provincial downloading of highways to municipalities. Despite this, the highway has retained its name. The off ramp from westbound 401 lists Kingston Road with a number 2 regional road marker, despite the fact the road does not have any numerical designation within Toronto.

Exit list

References 
Sources

Bibliography

Toronto highways
002A